Rechnoye is a rural locality (a selo) and the administrative center of Rechnovsky Selsoviet, Kharabalinsky District, Astrakhan Oblast, Russia. The population was 900 as of 2010. There are 17 streets.

Geography
Rechnoye is located 71 km southeast of Kharabali (the district's administrative centre) by road. Zavolzhskoye is the nearest rural locality.

References

Rural localities in Kharabalinsky District